The 1978–79 Major Indoor Soccer League season was the first in league history and would end with the New York Arrows winning the first MISL title.

Recap
The league would begin with six teams and a 24-game schedule beginning in December 1978 and ending in March 1979. The top four teams would advance to a single-game semifinal and a best of three championship series. League attendance would average 4,453 per game.

Signs were good that the league would have a long-time presence. The early games drew strong crowds, as Philadelphia sold out the Spectrum for their opener, leading the league in attendance. The first expansion team was announced on December 13, nine days before the first game in league history, as the Buffalo Stallions were slated to start play in the 1979-80 season. 10,386 fans were in the Nassau Coliseum to see the Cincinnati Kids play the Arrows in the league's first game.

Despite finishing in a solid third place, Cincinnati folded after the season.

Teams

Regular season

Schedule

The 1978–79 regular season schedule ran from December 22, 1978, to March 18, 1979. 
 Each team played a schedule of 24 games.

Final standings
Playoff teams in bold.

Team attendance

Regular season statistics

Scoring leaders
GP = Games Played, G = Goals, A = Assists, Pts = Points

Goalkeeping leaders
Note: GP = Games played; Min = Minutes played; GA = Goals against; GAA = Goals against average; W = Wins; L = Losses

Playoffs

Bracket

Semifinals

Championship Series

Playoff statistics

Playoff scoring
GP = Games Played, G = Goals, A = Assists, Pts = Points

Playoff goalkeeping
Note: GP = Games played; Min = Minutes played; GA = Goals against; GAA = Goals against average; W = Wins; L = Losses

League awards
Most Valuable Player: Steve Zungul, New York

Scoring Champion: Fred Grgurev, Philadelphia

Pass Master: Fred Grgurev, Philadelphia

Goalkeeper of the Year: Paul Hammond, Houston

Coach of the Year: Timo Liekoski, Houston

Championship Series Most Valuable Player: Shep Messing, New York

All-MISL team

References

External links
 The Year in American Soccer – 1978
 The Year in American Soccer - 1979
 1978-79 summary at The MISL: A Look Back

Major Indoor Soccer League (1978–1992) seasons
Major
Major